Andreas Stefanopoulos (1860–1938) was a Greek politician.

Andreas Stephanopoulos was born in Pyrgos and was the son of Stephanos Stephanopoulos, a politician.  He studied law and political sciences in Athens and Paris and was educated early as a politician.  He was elected as a representative for Elis in the Greek parliament in 1892 with Charilaos Trikoupis' party and was re-elected every time until 1929. Then he became a senator, until the Greek Senate was abolished in 1935. He was Minister for Naval Affairs in the 1903 cabinet of Georgios Theotokis, and Minister for Education in the 1905 cabinet of Theotokis. He died in 1938. He was the brother of Christos Stefanopoulos.

References

1857 births
1939 deaths
Members of the Greek Senate 1929–1932
Members of the Greek Senate 1932–1935
People from Pyrgos, Elis
Politicians from Elis
Ministers of Naval Affairs of Greece
Ministers of National Education and Religious Affairs of Greece
Greek MPs 1892–1895
Greek MPs 1895–1899
Greek MPs 1899–1902
Greek MPs 1902–1905
Greek MPs 1905–1906
Greek MPs 1906–1910